Letchworth was the name of two steamships of the Watergate Steamship Co Ltd:

, bombed and sunk in the Thames Estuary on 1 November 1940
, ex Empire Caxton

Ship names